St Johns Bush is a reserve in East Auckland in New Zealand. It is situated in a small valley near the larger Kepa Bush Reserve. It is named after the nearby suburb St Johns.

Flora and fauna
Flora and fauna inside the reserve include a large kauri tree which is almost in the middle of the reserve. Other trees include kanuka, karaka, kowhai, pohutukawa and rimu.

A small wetland system that runs through the reserve is home to longfin eel. Whitebait and freshwater bivalves are also present.

The native birds of the reserve include tui, New Zealand pigeons, grey warblers, silvereyes and New Zealand fantails. Introduced species including eastern rosella and Australian magpies are occasionally seen.

Kaka sometimes stop off at St Johns Bush on their way to the Whangaparaoa Peninsula on the North Shore. Kaka feed off berries and fruit.

History
St Johns Bush was made into a reserve almost immediately after the surrounding bush was farmed. In 1994 Auckland Council initiated a plan to rezone a considerable part of St Johns Bush. Forest & Bird became involved and this was ceased. In 2000 Auckland Council acquired St Johns Bush. In 2004 Auckland Council purchased another hectare of land.

References

Geography of Auckland
Parks in Auckland
Urban forests in New Zealand